The 2007 Ontario Scotties Tournament of Hearts was held January 22-28 at the Dixie Curling Club in Mississauga, Ontario.  Krista Scharf's rink from Thunder Bay, Ontario won their second straight provincial title.

Teams

Standings

External links
Ontario Curling Association

2007 in Canadian curling
Ontario Scotties Tournament of Hearts
Sport in Mississauga